Wiadomości (News) is the chief Polish news program produced by Telewizja Polska and broadcast on the first channel, TVP1. The main edition is transmitted daily at 7:30p.m. CET. It premiered on 18 November 1989 and succeeded the Dziennik Telewizyjny (Television Journal), which was aired during the communist era for over 31 years. In September 2020, Wiadomości was the most popular news program in Poland, with an average of 2.66 million viewers a day.

Since 14 September 2016, the acting editor-in-chief is Jarosław Olechowski.

Since the first telecast, a letter W composed of two V letters serves as the program's official logo.

History 
Wiadomości replaced the infamous Dziennik Telewizyjny, a newscast that was a symbol of communist propaganda in the Polish People's Republic during the Cold War. The first edition of Wiadomości aired on 18 November 1989 and was hosted by journalist Wojciech Reszczyński. Reszczyński greeted the audiences with a message: "Good evening, I hope that this program will gain your approbation in the upcoming days. The information contained in this program will be either good or bad, but always true and we count on help and cooperation."

Controversy

Accusations of propaganda 
In the 2010s, the program has been accused of becoming a propaganda outlet for the ruling Law and Justice party. Historian and columnist Timothy Garton Ash, writing for The Guardian, praised the competing Fakty TVN's critical coverage of government issues when harshly criticising Telewizja Polska's Wiadomości (News).The Facts is not BBC-style impartial: it clearly favours a more liberal, pro-European Poland and is strongly anti-PiS. But unlike the so-called News, it is still definitely professional, high quality, reality-based journalism.

Current presenters

Main editions (19:30) 
 Edyta Lewandowska (2019–present)
 Danuta Holecka (1997, 2003–2004, 2010, 2016–present)
 Michał Adamczyk (2004, 2011–2012, 2016–present)

Other editions (from Monday to Friday: 8:00, 12:00, 15:00) 
 Katarzyna Trzaskalska (2017–present)
 Agnieszka Oszczyk (2017–present)
 Michał Rynkowski (2018–present)
 Bartłomiej Graczak (2018–present)

See also 
 Teleexpress
 Panorama

References

External links 

Polish television shows
1989 Polish television series debuts
Polish television news shows
1980s Polish television series
1990s Polish television series
2000s Polish television series
2010s Polish television series
2020s Polish television series
Telewizja Polska original programming